= Central defence =

Central defence may refer to one of the following:

- An association football position, see centre back
- A military strategy on how to use fortifications, see central defence (strategy)
